Trisha Edwards is an Academy Award-nominated set decorator. She was nominated at the 77th Academy Awards in the category of Best Art Direction for her work on the film Finding Neverland. She shared her nomination with Gemma Jackson.

Selected filmography

 Excalibur (1981)
 The French Lieutenant's Woman (1981)
 Moll Flanders (1996)
 Iris (2001)
 Finding Neverland (2004)

References

External links

Living people
Set decorators
Year of birth missing (living people)